de la Haye, de La Haye, or de-la-Haye is the surname of:

Charlotte-Jeanne Béraud de La Haye de Riou, known as Madame de Montesson (1738–1806), playwright, wife of Louis Philippe d'Orléans, duc d'Orléans
Corneille de La Haye, also known as Corneille de Lyon (died 1575), Dutch portrait painter
Jean de La Haye (1593–1661), French Franciscan preacher and Biblical scholar
Louis Marie de la Haye, Vicomte de Cormenin (1788–1868), French jurist and political pamphleteer
Nicola de la Haye (between 1150 and 1156 to 1230), castellan of Lincoln castle, England
Donald De La Haye (born 1996), American football kicker for the Toronto Argonauts and YouTube personality

See also
De la Hay (disambiguation)
Delahaye, automobile manufacturer
Delahaye (surname)

Surnames of French origin